Stroud railway station is a railway station that serves the town of Stroud in Gloucestershire, England. Stroud railway station (on the Gloucester–Swindon Golden Valley Line) was designed by Isambard Kingdom Brunel.

History
The station was opened on 12 May 1845 with the opening of the Kemble to Gloucester section of the Cheltenham and Great Western Union Railway, later part of the Great Western Railway. For a period between 1886 and 1947, when Stroud had two passenger railway stations, it was known as Stroud Great Western, Stroud Russell Street or Stroud Central. Stroud's second station, Stroud Wallbridge, was the terminus of a short branch line from the Midland Railway's Stonehouse and Nailsworth Railway, and freight services were always more important there than passengers.

In 1905, the Great Western Railway inaugurated a motor bus service between Stroud and Painswick, similar to systems in operation at other places such as Penzance and Slough. The services were operated by Mills Daimler vehicles with 22hp petrol engines, capable of carrying 22 passengers. The journey time was around 30 minutes.

Stationmasters

Mr. Taylor, ca. 1854
William John Hamilton Notter, 1858–1862
John Parkinson, 1862–1866 (formerly station master at Cirencester, afterwards station master at Cirencester)
Thomas Smith, 1866–1869 (formerly station master at Cirencester, afterwards goods agent at Hereford)
John Robert Ward, 1869–1876
Lawrence Henry Nolan, 1876–1897
Richard Roberts, 1897–1909 (formerly station master at Ledbury)
George Libby, 1909–1915 (formerly station master at Warwick)
W.P. Roberts, 1915–1916 (formerly station master at Ross on Wye, afterwards station master at Gloucester)
T. Cobourne, 1916–1919 (afterwards station master at Cheltenham)
W.H. Reed, 1919–1925
A.M. Taylor, 1925–1926 (formerly station master at Melksham)
Mr. Mason, ca. 1926
C.W. Wilson, ca. 1930–1936
George Edwin Howell, 1936–1942 (formerly station master at Abergavenny)
W.J. Hough, 1943–ca. 1950 (formerly station master at Kington)

Description
Stroud station has two platforms and is served by Great Western Railway. The station has a ticket office, located on the Swindon-bound platform, whose opening times are in theory 7am to mid-afternoon Monday - Saturday, though in reality somewhat erratic due to staff shortages (November 2021), and it is not currently open on Sundays.  There is a ticket machine on the same platform as the ticket office.

Services 
Great Western Railway operates services from London Paddington to Gloucester and Cheltenham using Class 800 trains, and limited local services from Swindon to Gloucester and Cheltenham using the former Class 165 two-carriage sets. Trains call hourly each way Monday to Saturday, with some additional weekday business peak services. On Sundays, there is an hourly service between Swindon and Cheltenham Spa, with 3 services a day onwards to Paddington.

References

External links 
  A history of the Swindon-to-Gloucester line
 

Stroud
Railway stations in Gloucestershire
DfT Category D stations
Former Great Western Railway stations
Railway stations in Great Britain opened in 1845
Railway stations served by Great Western Railway